Thales is an unincorporated community in Harbison Township, Dubois County, in the U.S. state of Indiana.

History
Thales was known as Hickory Grove until 1895.

A post office was established under the name Hickory Grove in 1879, and was discontinued in 1887. Another post office named Thales opened in 1895, and remained in operation until it was discontinued in 1909.

Geography

References

Unincorporated communities in Dubois County, Indiana
Unincorporated communities in Indiana
Jasper, Indiana micropolitan area